Natasha Mazen Yousef Al-Naber (born 15 March 1995), known as Natasha Al-Naber, is a Jordanian footballer who plays as a midfielder for local Women's League club Shabab Al-Ordon and the Jordan women's national team. She is the sister of Stephanie Al-Naber and Yousef Al-Naber.

References 

1995 births
Living people
Jordanian women's footballers
Jordan women's international footballers
Women's association football midfielders
Sportspeople from Amman
Jordan Women's Football League players